Klanc is a settlement in the Municipality of Dobrna in Slovenia. It lies in the hills just north of Dobrna. The area is part of the traditional region of Styria and is now included in the Savinja Statistical Region.

References

External links
Klanc on Geopedia

Populated places in the Municipality of Dobrna